Sebastião Leal is a municipality in the state of Piauí in the Northeast region of Brazil.

See also
List of municipalities in Piauí

References

Municipalities in Piauí